Henry Graves Bull (15 January 1818, Northamptonshire – 31 October 1885, Hereford) was a British medical doctor, botanist, mycologist, naturalist, historian, and one of the early presidents of the Woolhope Naturalists' Field Club. He is noteworthy as a mycologist, pomologist, and the co-editor with Robert Hogg of the 2-volume work The Herefordshire Pomona, published in 7 parts from 1876 to 1885. The 2 volumes contain full descriptions of 423 varieties of apples and pears.

Biography
Bull began his medical career in 1834 at Northampton General Infirmary. He pursued medical studies at Edinburgh, spent a year at the medical school schools of Paris, and then completed his M.D. at Edinburgh. There he won two gold medals for his medical essays and received Sir Charles Bell's prize for surgery. In 1841 he settled in Hereford to practise medicine. He lived in Harley House near Hereford Cathedral. He practised medicine at Hereford Dispensary from 1842 until the week before his death. He was appointed to the staff of the General Infirmary in 1864. He had a large practice and gave advice free of charge to many indigent patients. From 1846 to 1880 he served as Medical Officer to the Hereford Prison.

In 1851 Bull was one of the thirty founders of the Woolhope Naturalists' Field Club. In 1867 he established the club's fungus forays. He was for many years the editor-in-chief of the Transactions of the Woolhope Naturalists' Field Club.

In the 1840s he was among the first medical doctors in England to use diethyl ether as an anaesthetic. He observed the causal role of contaminated water in cholera.

In 1854 Dr. Bull married Elizabeth Read in St Giles, London. By 1871 they had four sons and four daughters. In Hereford he was very civic-minded and improved Herefordshire's facilities of health and education. Upon his death in 1885 at age 67, he was survived by his widow, two sons, and four daughters.

His house in Hereford displays an English Heritage blue plaque. A memorial tablet in Hereford Cathedral records his life and work.

The National Museum of Wales has Bull's botanical and mycological specimens. His letters are at the Natural History Museum, London. The Royal Botanic Gardens, Kew curates his drawings of Hereford fungi.

Selected publications

Articles
 
 
 
  (See Viscum album.)

Books

References

1818 births
1885 deaths
19th-century English medical doctors
19th-century English non-fiction writers
19th-century British botanists
English botanical writers
English mycologists
Pomologists
Alumni of the University of Edinburgh